I Know Who Holds Tomorrow is an album by American violinist/singer Alison Krauss and the Cox Family, released in 1994.

At the Grammy Awards of 1995, I Know Who Holds Tomorrow won the Grammy Award for Best Southern, Country or Bluegrass Gospel Album.

Track listing
 "Walk Over God's Heaven" (Thomas A. Dorsey) – 2:57
 "Will There Be Any Stars" (Traditional) – 3:12
 "Where No One Stands Alone" (Merle Haggard, Mosie Lister) – 3:00
 "Never Will Give Up" (David Marshall) – 3:42
 "Remind Me Dear Lord" (Traditional, Dottie Rambo) – 3:25
 "I Know Who Holds Tomorrow" (Ira Stanphill) – 5:03
 "Everybody Wants To Go To Heaven" (Loretta Lynn) – 2:47
 "I'd Rather Have Jesus" (George Beverly Shea, Rhea F. Miller) – 3:17
 "Far Side Bank Of Jordan" (Terry Smith) – 3:22
 "In the Palm Of Your Hand" (Ron Block) – 3:24
 "Loves Me Like A Rock" (Paul Simon) – 3:03
 "Jewels" (George F. Root, William Cushing) – 2:56

Personnel
 Alison Krauss – fiddle, vocals
 Ron Block – banjo, vocals
 Barry Bales – bass, vocals
 Suzanne Cox – vocals
 Evelyn Cox – vocals
 Rob Ickes – dobro
 Viktor Krauss – bass
 Lynn Cox – vocals
 Kenny Malone – drums
 Kayton Roberts – steel guitar
 Sidney Cox – vocals
 Gary W. Smith – piano
 Adam Steffey – mandolin
 Willard Cox – vocals
 Andrea Zonn – fiddle

Chart positions

References

1994 albums
Alison Krauss & Union Station albums
Rounder Records albums